Mour Paye (born 25 May 1994) is a French professional footballer who plays as a forward for Championnat National 3 club Hauts Lyonnais.

Career
Paye was a product of the training centre of Lyon, where he signed his first professional contract in 2014. In June 2016 he signed a two-year contract with Ligue 2 side Troyes. He made his professional debut for Troyes as a second half substitute in a 2–1 Ligue 2 defeat at Ajaccio on 5 August 2016. He left the club at the conclusion of his first season, having played 10 games in all competitions, and signed for Championnat National side Créteil.

Paye left Créteil when the 2017–18 season ended in relegation. He did not immediately sign for another club, but spent three months training with Villefranche, who eventually signed him in February 2019.

On 2 December 2019 Championnat National 2 club Saint-Priest confirmed, that Paye had joined the club, having been a free agent since leaving Villefranche at the end of the 2018–19 season.

In July 2020, Paye signed a one-year amateur contract with Championnat National side Bastia-Borgo. In 2021, he signed for Championnat National 3 side Hauts Lyonnais.

References

External links
 

1994 births
Living people
Footballers from Lyon
French footballers
Association football forwards
French sportspeople of Senegalese descent
Olympique Lyonnais players
ES Troyes AC players
US Créteil-Lusitanos players
FC Villefranche Beaujolais players
AS Saint-Priest players
FC Bastia-Borgo players
Hauts Lyonnais players
Championnat National 2 players
Ligue 2 players
Championnat National players
Championnat National 3 players